Polish road signs typeface – geometrical typeface meant to making text on Polish road signs, according to Attachment 1 of Regulation on detailed technical conditions for road signs and signals as well as road safety devices and conditions for their placement on roads. The regulation defines a construction of digits, all of the letters of Polish alphabet and the letter V (not including Q and X), and the punctuation marks: hyphen, round brackets, comma, full stop (period) and exclamation mark.

The typeface has been created by Marek Sigmund, who made the project commissioned by the state authorities in 1975, while the Instruction about road signs and signals was being implemented. The typeface has been designed in six weeks. According to the designer's assumptions, the typeface included creating text on boards by using the freehand and stencil techniques.

This typeface has poor readibility when trying to read a small text while driving at high speed.

Electronic versions 
There are three fonts that imitate road signs typeface. Two of them are available as non-commercial freeware:
 Liternictwo Drogowe – distributed by the company Centrum Rozwoju Explotrans S.A. that cooperates with Ministry of Infrastructure. It completely matches the Regulation. Meant mainly for the enterprises that produce road signs.
 Tabica drogowa – created in 2001 by Grzegorz Klimczewski. This version has all the markings that are defined in the Regulation and also additional ones (including Q and X letters). Some of not included marks (quotation mark, question mark, percent sign) have been replaced by arrows. At first, the font was distributed as a paid one but currently it is a non-commercial freeware.
 Drogowskaz – created in 2006 by Emil Wojtacki. Apart from the markings defined in the Regulation, it includes many more, designed in style of the original typeface, such as scribal abbreviations and diacritics used in various languages. The font is distributed as non-commercial freeware.

References 

Display typefaces
Geometric sans-serif typefaces
Government typefaces
Grotesque sans-serif typefaces
Sans-serif typefaces